The Michael Ball Show is a British topical entertainment show broadcast on ITV in 2010. It featured entertainment, discussion and showbiz glamour with the occasional musical performance from Michael himself, often on the Friday edition of the show. It occupied the slot filled by The Alan Titchmarsh Show during its summer break in 2010.

Format
Part one of the show featured Michael and four of the day's guests discussing a topic of the day. The guests were usually the two main guests along with the Cash for Questions quiz-master and either the musical guest or the chef of the day.
The second part of the show featured an interview with a guest, who is unknown, not a celebrity, with a story which they tell before Michael and the day's chef cook a guest's favourite a dish which they serve to her or him.

Part three of the show was a brief chat with the musical guest who then performed. Part three also featured a chat with a special guest. The fourth and final part of the show started off with the viewer competition Cash for Questions. To finish off the show, Michael was joined by his final special guest of the day.

There was often a musical theatre theme to The Michael Ball Show, with guests such as Sir Cameron Mackintosh, Lord Andrew Lloyd Webber and Kerry Ellis, and performances from the casts of shows including Wicked, Billy Elliot and Love Never Dies appearing on the show.

Cash for Questions
Each day, there was new question and the prize fund was determined by Cash for Questions, the viewer competition in which Michael himself takes part in answering questions given by the day's quizmaster. Each question was worth £100, and the amount in the fund after one minute was the prize for the viewer competition. The quizmaster was the same person on each week depending on the day, with the quizmasters remaining the same throughout the series. They were:

Filming and broadcast
The show was pre-recorded at BBC Television Centre's studio TC3 in London. It was recorded on Wednesdays and Thursdays and broadcast Monday to Friday on ITV.

The show was originally commissioned for Summer 2010, to be shown whilst The Alan Titchmarsh Show was on its summer break. It is not yet known if a second series will be commissioned.

Episodes

External links

2010 British television series debuts
2010 British television series endings
2010s British television talk shows
British television talk shows
ITV (TV network) original programming